Steve Joel Moffett Jr., better known by his stage name Stevie Joe or Thuggy Fresh, is an American  rapper from Oakland. He is a member of the group Livewire and is signed to Town Thizzness and Thizz Nation, both subdivisions of the late Mac Dre's Thizz Entertainment. He has been featured on many Bay Area hip hop albums, most notably E-40's 2011 album Revenue Retrievin': Graveyard Shift, on a song called "Don't Try This at Home", with frequent collaborator Philthy Rich, also from Oakland. He also appears in the soundtrack to the 2008 film Ghostride the Whip.

Discography

Studio albums

 Thuggy Fresh (2008)
 7.0 Grams (2010)
 14.0 Grams (2010)
 80's Baby (2010)
 The Leak (2010)
 Thuggy Fresh - The Street Album Part 2 (2010)
 21.0 Grams (2011)
 Thizz Nation 28 (2011)
 LoveWire (2012)
 The Tonight Show With Stevie Joe (2012)
 Live On The Wire (2013)
 420: The Album (2015)
 Thuggy Life (2016)
 Block Statue 3 (2016)

EPs

 2013 Gold Mind 
 2014 420
 2014 710
 2014 Gold Mind 2
 2015 Gold Mind 3

Compilations

 2012 The Best of Stevie Joe

Mixtapes

 2009 Block Statue Part 2
 2009 Coke
 2009 Oxycontin (OC-80)
 2009 Swag It And Bag It
 2010 Quit Hatin On The Bay - Thuggy Fresh Edition Starring Stevie Joe
 2011 Big Bucks & Styrofoam Cups
 2011 Shop Open
 2012 Ass N' Kusher
 2012 Red Eye Flight

with Livewire

 2009 The Empire
 2011 I Pledge Allegiance To The Wire
 2012 Mafia
 2012 I Pledge Allegiance To The Wire 2

Collaborations

 2008: Philthy Rich & Stevie Joe - Philthy Rich
 2014: Philthy Fresh 2 - Philthy Rich
 2014: Pounds & Pryex - Anonymous That Dude
 2016: Not Your Average Joe - Willie Joe
 2016: Philthy Fresh 3 - Philthy Rich
 2016: Extracurricular Activities - Mozzy
 2018: After Hours - Remy R.E.D

Guest appearances

References

African-American male rappers
Living people
Musicians from Oakland, California
Rappers from the San Francisco Bay Area
21st-century American rappers
21st-century American male musicians
Year of birth missing (living people)
21st-century African-American musicians